Abbas Al-Hassan (born 22 February 2004) is a Saudi Arabian professional footballer who plays as a midfielder for Saudi Professional League side Al-Fateh.

Personal life
Abbas is the brother of the player Ali Al-Hassan.

Career
Al-Hassan started his career at the youth team of Al-Fateh and represented the club at every level.

Career statistics

Club

Notes

Honours

International
Saudi Arabia U20
 Arab Cup U-20: 2021

References

External links
 

2004 births
Living people
People from Al-Hasa
Saudi Arabian footballers
Association football midfielders
Al-Fateh SC players
Saudi Professional League players
Saudi Arabian Shia Muslims